Turrisipho dalli is a species of sea snail, a marine gastropod mollusk in the family Colidae, the true whelks.

Description

The length of the shell attains .

Distribution
This species occurs in the Atlantic Ocean off Canada.

References

External links
 Tryon, G. W. (1880-1881). Manual of conchology, structural and systematic, with illustrations of the species, ser. 1., vol. 3: Tritonidae, Fusidae, Buccinidae. pp 1-310, pls 1-87. Philadelphia, published by the author
 Bouchet, P. & Warén, A. (1985). Revision of the Northeast Atlantic bathyal and abyssal Neogastropoda excluding Turridae (Mollusca, Gastropoda). Bollettino Malacologico. supplement 1: 121-296.

Colidae
Gastropods described in 1881